Yukina is a female Japanese given name.

Possible Writings
雪名, "snow, name"
雪菜, "snow, vegetable"
雪奈, "snow, endure"
幸奈, "fortune, endure"
希奈, "rare, endure"

People with the name
, Japanese volleyball player
Yukina Kashiwa (柏幸奈, born 1994), Japanese actress and idol singer
Yukina Kinoshita (木下 優樹菜, born 1987)
Yukina Ota (太田 由希奈, born 1986), Japanese figure skater
Yukina Shirakawa (白川ゆきな, born 1985), Japanese model

Fictional characters
Yukina (YuYu Hakusho), a character in YuYu Hakusho media
Yukina, a character in Kabaneri of the Iron Fortress
Yukina Kiritani, as in Imocho
Yukina Minato, a character in BanG Dream!
Yukina Himeragi, a character in Strike the Blood
Yukina Himuro, a character in Missions of Love
Yukina Shirahane, a character in Kuromukuro

Japanese feminine given names